Craugastor vocalis is a species of frog in the family Craugastoridae.
It is endemic to Mexico.
Its natural habitats are subtropical or tropical dry forests and subtropical or tropical moist montane forests.
It is threatened by habitat loss.

References

vocalis
Endemic amphibians of Mexico
Frogs of North America
Least concern biota of North America
Amphibians described in 1940
Taxonomy articles created by Polbot
Fauna of the Sierra Madre Occidental
Fauna of the Sierra Madre del Sur